The 1961 All-Big Ten Conference football team consists of American football players chosen by various organizations for All-Big Ten Conference teams for the 1961 Big Ten Conference football season.

All-Big Ten selections

Quarterbacks
 Sandy Stephens, Minnesota (AP-1; UPI-1)
Ron Miller, Wisconsin (AP-2)

Halfbacks
 Bennie McRae, Michigan (AP-1; UPI-1)
 George Saimes, Michigan State (AP-1; UPI-1)
 Sherman Lewis, Michigan State (AP-2)
 Dave Raimey, Michigan (AP-2; UPI-2)
 Bill Munsey, Minnesota (UPI-2)

Fullbacks
 Bob Ferguson, Ohio State (AP-1; UPI-1)
 Marv Woodson, Indiana (AP-2)
 Bill Tunicliff, Michigan (UPI-2)

Ends
 Pat Richter, Wisconsin (AP-1; UPI-1)
Jack Elwell, Purdue (AP-1)
Tom Hall, Minnesota (AP-2; UPI-1)
Tom Perdue, Ohio State (AP-2)

Tackles
 Bobby Bell, Minnesota (AP-1; UPI-1)
 Dave Behrman, Michigan State (AP-1)
 Fate Echols, Northwestern (AP-2; UPI-1)
 Don Brumm, Purdue (AP-2)
 Bob Vogel, Ohio State (UPI-2)

Guards
 Mike Ingram, Ohio State (AP-1; UPI-1)
 Stan Sezurek, Iowa (AP-1; UPI-2)
 Tony Parrilli, Illinois (AP-2; UPI-1)
 Sherwyn Thorson, Iowa (AP-2)

Centers
 Larry Onesti, Northwestern (AP-1; UPI-1)
 Bill Van Buren, Iowa (AP-2)

Key
AP = Associated Press

UPI = United Press International

Bold = Consensus first-team selection of both the AP and UPI

See also
1961 College Football All-America Team

References

All-Big Ten Conference
All-Big Ten Conference football teams